Hoàng Tích Chù (Từ Sơn; 1912 in Bắc Ninh – 20 October 2003) was a Vietnamese painter.

References

1912 births
2003 deaths
People from Bắc Ninh province
20th-century Vietnamese painters